The Secret of Tears is the third studio album from Hong Kong female singer-songwriter Jinny Ng released on 21 January 2016 along with 4 postcards. It includes 11 songs, with "The Beautiful Times", "The Secret of Tears" and "We Are All Hurt" as the lead singles as well as her original work, "Letting You Go".

Background 
Jinny, in the interview of Billboard Radio China, tells that music likes a dairy which can records down and expresses feelings. She said, inspiration usually come when she was taking shower and that's how it works for "Letting You Go". For the lyrics, she was inspired by an online upload and is also relevant to her own experiences. The song delivers the message of letting go.

"Falling into You" is a song collaborated with Dominic Chu, a friend she known 6 years ago. The song tells how Jinny see love: giving all of herself to the one she loved, and cannot take it back even the relationship is not stable.

Sources come from an interview from Billboard Radio China.

Track listing

Music videos

Chart performance

Album

Singles

Other charted songs

Awards

Album 
 2016 IFPI Hong Kong Sales Awards – Top 10 Cantopop Albums

The Beautiful Times 
 2015 Jade Solid Gold Songs Selection Part 1 – Winning Song

The Secret of Tears 
 2015 Jade Solid Gold Songs Selection Part 1 – Winning Song
 2015 TVB Anniversary Awards – Best Soundtrack
 2015 Jade Solid Gold Best 10 Awards Presentation – Jade Solid Gold Best 10 Songs
 2015 Jade Solid Gold Best 10 Awards Presentation – Jade Solid Gold Best Song
 2015 Metro Hits Awards – Most Streamed Song
 2015 Top Ten Chinese Gold Songs Award Concert – Top 10 Chinese Gold Songs
 2015 TVB8 Mandarin Music on Demand Awards Presentation – Top Mandarin Songs
 2015 TVB8 Mandarin Music on Demand Awards Presentation – Gold Songs

We Are All Hurt 
 2015 Jade Solid Gold Songs Selection Part 2 – Winning Song
 2015 Jade Solid Gold Best 10 Awards Presentation – Jade Solid Gold Best 10 Songs

Love 
 2016 Jade Solid Gold Songs Selection Part 1 – Winning Song

References 

Jinny Ng albums
2016 albums